The chemical compound xylylene dichloride (C6H4(CH2Cl)2) is a white to light yellow sandlike solid. This compound can be classified as a benzyl halide.  Xylylene dichloride is used as a vulcanizing agent to harden rubbers. It catalyzes the crosslinking of phenolic resins.

Structure and reactivity 
The structure of xylylene dichloride is characterized by an benzene ring with two chloromethyl groups and four hydrogen atoms bound to it. The chloromethyl groups can be located on different sites on the ring, leading to a few different possible forms. These forms are:

o-xylylene dichloride: 1,2-bis(chloromethyl)benzene
m-xylylene dichloride: 1,3-bis(chloromethyl)benzene
p-xylylene dichloride: 1,4-bis(chloromethyl)benzene

The reactive groups of xylylene dichloride are the two CH2Cl groups.

Synthesis 
Xylylene dichloride can be synthesized from benzenedimethanol by reaction with hydrogen chloride.  It has also been produced by photochemical chlorination of ortho-xylene.

Related compounds
Xylylene dibromide, the dibromo analogue of the title compound.

References 

Organochlorides